Copulabyssia gradata is a species of small sea snail, a marine gastropod mollusk in the family Pseudococculinidae, the false limpets.

Distribution
This marine species is endemic to New Zealand

References

 Marshall B.A. (1986 ["1985"]) Recent and Tertiary Cocculinidae and Pseudococculinidae (Mollusca: Gastropoda) from New Zealand and New South Wales. New Zealand Journal of Zoology 12: 505-546

External links
 To GenBank (1 nucleotides; 0 proteins)
 To World Register of Marine Species

Pseudococculinidae
Gastropods described in 1986